Neoheliodines is a genus of moths belonging to the family Heliodinidae. It is endemic to the Americas.

Species:
 Neoheliodines arizonense
 Neoheliodines cliffordi
 Neoheliodines hodgesi
 Neoheliodines nyctaginella
 Neoheliodines vernius

References  

Heliodinidae
Moth genera